Duane Eddy Washington Jr. (born March 24, 2000) is an American professional basketball player for the New York Knicks of the National Basketball Association (NBA), on a two-way contract with the Westchester Knicks of the NBA G League. He played college basketball for the Ohio State Buckeyes.

Washington is the son of former NBA player Duane Washington.

Early life and high school career
Washington was born in Frankfurt, Germany, while his father was playing for Skyliners Frankfurt. Washington was raised in Grand Rapids, Michigan, and went to high school for his first three years at Grand Rapids Christian High School. He averaged 13.1 points and 4.5 assists as a junior. Washington transferred to Sierra Canyon School in Los Angeles before his senior season of high school. He transferred to go to his uncle Derek Fisher's basketball camp and live with Fisher. During his time at Sierra Canyon, he played with Scotty Pippen Jr., Cassius Stanley, and Kenyon Martin Jr. He averaged 15.5 points per game, 4.5 rebounds per game, and 3.8 assists per game as a senior.

Recruiting
Washington was considered a four-star recruit by ESPN and a three-star recruit by 247Sports and Rivals. On September 20, 2017, Washington committed to play college basketball for Ohio State over offers from teams such as Michigan, UCLA, and Butler.

College career
In Washington's second game at Ohio State against Purdue Fort Wayne, Washington scored 20 points in 21 minutes off the bench. For the year, he played in 35 games, starting two of them. He averaged 7 points per game, 2.5 rebounds per game, and 17.2 minutes per game.

During his sophomore year, Washington scored 20 points in a game two times, matching his careerhigh at the time. He, along with small forward Luther Muhammad, were suspended for the Nebraska game on January 14, 2019, for "failure to meet program standards". In total, he played in 28 games and started 15 of them. He averaged 11.5 points per game, which ranked second on the team.

Washington scored a careerhigh 30 points in an 87–92 loss against Michigan during his junior season. In the final seconds of Ohio State's overtime 2021 NCAA tournament first-round matchup against Oral Roberts, Washington missed what would've been a buzzerbeating threepointer to tie the game and force doubleovertime. Washington averaged 16.4 points, 3.4 rebounds, and 2.9 assists per game.

On March 31, 2021, Washington declared for the 2021 NBA draft while initially maintaining his college eligibility. However, on June 29, he announced he was remaining in the draft.

Professional career

Indiana Pacers (2021–2022)
After going undrafted in the 2021 NBA draft, Washington signed a two-way contract with the Indiana Pacers on August 5, 2021, splitting time with their G League affiliate, the Fort Wayne Mad Ants. On January 24, 2022, Washington scored a team-high 21 points, knocking down seven 3-pointers, setting a franchise record for most threes by a rookie while becoming the 36th rookie in the league history to hit seven threes in a game. On April 7, the Pacers converted his two-way contract into a standard one.

On July 14, 2022, Washington was waived by the Pacers.

Phoenix Suns (2022–2023)
On August 3, 2022, Washington signed a two-way contract with the Phoenix Suns. On December 27, he scored a career-high 26 points, alongside four rebounds and eight assists, in a 125–108 win over the Memphis Grizzlies. On February 1, 2023, Washington was waived by the Suns.

New York Knicks (2023–present)
On February 28, 2023, Washington signed a two-way contract with the New York Knicks.

Career statistics

NBA

|-
| style="text-align:left;"|
| style="text-align:left;"|Indiana
| 48 || 7 || 20.2 || .405 || .377 || .754 || 1.7 || 1.8 || .5 || .1 || 9.9
|-
| style="text-align:left;"|
| style="text-align:left;"|Phoenix
| 31 || 3 || 12.7 || .367 || .360 || .667 || 1.2 || 2.0 || .2 || .1 || 7.9
|- class="sortbottom"
| style="text-align:center;" colspan="2"|Career
| 79 || 10 || 17.2 || .391 || .371 || .729 || 1.5 || 1.9 || .4 || .1 || 9.1

College

|-
| style="text-align:left;"|2018–19
| style="text-align:left;"|Ohio State
| 35 || 2 || 17.1 || .370 || .306 || .647 || 2.5 || 1.1 || .3 || .0 || 7.0
|-
| style="text-align:left;"|2019–20
| style="text-align:left;"|Ohio State
| 28 || 15 || 24.9 || .403 || .393 || .833 || 2.8 || 1.4 || .4 || .1 || 11.5
|-
| style="text-align:left;"|2020–21
| style="text-align:left;"|Ohio State
| 31 || 31 || 32.2 || .410 || .374 || .835 || 3.4 || 2.9 || .4 || .0 || 16.4
|- class="sortbottom"
| style="text-align:center;" colspan="2"|Career
| 94 || 48 || 24.4 || .397 || .361 || .800 || 2.9 || 1.8 || .4 || .0 || 11.4

Personal life
Washington's father, Duane Washington Sr., and his uncle, Derek Fisher, both played in the NBA. Through his uncle, he became close with the late Kobe Bryant. He is a dual citizen of the United States and Germany.

References

External links

 Ohio State Buckeyes bio

2000 births
Living people
21st-century African-American sportspeople
African-American basketball players
American men's basketball players
Basketball players from Grand Rapids, Michigan
Fort Wayne Mad Ants players
Indiana Pacers players
Ohio State Buckeyes men's basketball players
Phoenix Suns players
Undrafted National Basketball Association players
Westchester Knicks players